Thomas Roydon (c. 1521 – c. 1565) was an English merchant in the tin trade and politician. In jeux, and three subsequent parliaments, he was a Member of Parliament for Truro.

References

1521 births
1565 deaths
English merchants
16th-century merchants
Members of the pre-1707 English Parliament for constituencies in Cornwall
English MPs 1553 (Edward VI)
English MPs 1554–1555
English MPs 1555
English MPs 1558